Andrea Sawatzki (born 23 February 1963) is a German actress.  From 2002 to 2010 she starred in the Hessischer Rundfunk version of the popular television crime series Tatort as police inspector Charlotte Sänger.

She also gained some international prominence as a co-actor in the German films Bandits (1997) and Das Experiment (2001).

Life and work
Sawatzki is the daughter of a nurse and a journalist. She has lived with actor Christian Berkel since 1997. The couple has two sons and live in Berlin.
 
After studying at the Neue Münchner Schauspielschule (Munich acting school) and doing an internship at the Munich Kammerspiele, Sawatzky played in theaters in Stuttgart, Wilhelmshaven and Munich from 1988 to 1992. In 1997, she became known to a broader audience through the movie The Pharmacist in which she played Alma Siebert. She made her breakthrough as one of the best known German actresses with her role as Chief Inspector Charlotte Sänger in the Tatort series from 2002 to 2010.
 
Moreover, she acted in successful movies such as Bandits, Leo & Claire and Das Experiment. She posed for a spread in Playboy magazine in 2003.
 
Sawatzki read for audio books as, for example, for the series TV-Kommissare lesen Krimis the story Die Maus in der Ecke and the novel Glennkill. 
In 2007, Sawatzki was godmother of the Deutscher Kinderpreis (German Children's Award).

Personal life
In 2011, Andrea Sawatzki married her long-term partner and fellow actor Christian Berkel. They have two sons together and live in Berlin.

Filmography

 1991: Tatort – 
 1992: Auf Achse (TV)
 1992: Tatort – Unversöhnlich
 1994: 
 1995–1998:  (TV series)
 1995: Polizeiruf 110 (TV) – 1A Landeier
 1997: Bandits
 1997: Bella Block (TV) – Geldgier
 1997: Life is All You Get
 1997: The Pharmacist
 1998:  (TV miniseries)
 1998: The Polar Bear
 1999: 
 1999: Our Island in the South Pacific
 1999: Apokalypso (TV film)
 1999: Klemperer – Ein Leben in Deutschland
 2000: Ants in the Pants
 2001: Das Experiment
 2001: Leo & Claire
 2001: Die Manns – Ein Jahrhundertroman (TV miniseries)
 2002–2010: Tatort
 2002: Der Mann von Nebenan
 2002: Die Affäre Semmeling (TV miniseries)
 2002: Sinan Toprak ist der Unbestechliche (TV)
 2002: Rosa Roth (TV series) – Geschlossene Gesellschaft
 2003: Mein erster Freund, Mutter und ich
 2005–2006: Arme Millionäre (TV series)
 2005: 
 2006: Helen, Fred und Ted
 2006: Das Schneckenhaus
 2007: 
 2007: Vom Atmen unter Wasser
 2008: Sechs auf einen Streich – Brüderchen und Schwesterchen (TV miniseries)
 2009: 
 2011: Mein Bruder, sein Erbe und ich
 2011: 
 2011: Borgia (TV series)
 2018: Subs
 2019: Bella Germania
 2021: The Masked Singer (German season 5) as Axolotl
 2022: Freibad

References

External links

Official Homepage

1963 births
Living people
German television actresses
People from Bad Tölz-Wolfratshausen
German film actresses
20th-century German actresses
21st-century German actresses